Richard James Flaherty (November 28, 1945 — May 9, 2015) was a captain in the United States Army who served in the Vietnam War. He was the shortest US serviceman in history.

Early life 
Flaherty was born on 28 November 1945 in Stamford, Connecticut. Doctors from Stamford Connecticut's Regional Hospital worked intensely to save the newborn as his mother wasn't aware of her blood group of Rh-negative. Due to the blood type, his growth was stunted which resulted in him being diagnosed with dwarfism.

Flaherty's Irish ancestry came from his grandfather, Joseph Patrick Flaherty, who was born in Aran Islands, and his grandmother, Bridget Smythe, who was born in Feakle.

Growing up, Flaherty was sensitive about his height (4'9"), therefore he tried to achieve the best physical fitness and learned martial arts.

Flaherty was promoted to 2nd Lieutenant after attending Infantry Officer Candidate School on 31 August 1967.

Service career 
He was assigned to the 101st Airborne Division during his first tour to Vietnam in 1968 during the Vietnam War. He was a Platoon Leader and Recon Platoon Leader with companies B, C, D, & E. Flaherty participated in some fierce combat outside of Hue City during the Tet Offensive which earned him a Silver Star, 2 Bronze Stars and 2 Purple Hearts.

He returned to the US at the end of his tour and attended Special Forces Officer Course at Fort Bragg. Upon graduation he was assigned to the 3rd Special Forces Group (Airborne) as a Special Forces Operations Detachment A (SFODA) Commander in Company A of the 3rd SFG in Thailand. Later that year, he was reassigned to the 10th Special Forces Group at Fort Devens. He served as an SFODA Commander in companies A and B. He left the Army in 1971 at the rank of captain due to a reduction in force.

Later life 
After being discharged, Flaherty did private and military contract work in Rhodesia and Angola in Africa. The Central Intelligence Agency recruited him in the late 1970s due to his knowledge of Intelligence. The primary focus of his time in the CIA was supplying the Nicaraguan Contras in Nicaragua.  His stint with the CIA came to an end when he was arrested for possessing silencers.

After being removed from the CIA, Flaherty helped catch a smuggling ring at Fort Bragg, North Carolina and worked undercover for the Bureau of Alcohol, Tobacco, Firearms and Explosives as an informant.

Flaherty was killed on May 9, 2015 in a hit and run.  Fifteen years before Flaherty's death, he was befriended by Miami Police officer David Yuzuk after Flaherty became homeless. Just 10 days before Flaherty's death, Flaherty told Yuzuk his story.  After Flaherty's death, Yuzuk went to look into his history and uncovered troves of information from Flaherty's storage unit, such as his passport with stamps from Cambodia, Venezuela, Iraq and Jordan. Flaherty was buried at Forest Memorial Park in Milton.

Documentary film
David Yuzuk directed, co-produced and co-wrote a biographical documentary film about the life of Flaherty, The Giant Killer, which was released in 2017. It has a rating of 7.4 on IMDb.

Awards and decorations

References

External Links
https://blog.theveteranssite.greatergood.com/smallest-beret-vet/

1945 births
2015 deaths
United States Army officers
People from Stamford, Connecticut
Military personnel from Connecticut
Recipients of the Silver Star